Théo Bergerat (January 29, 1876 – August 25, 1934) was a French film director of the silent era.

Selected filmography
 Ramparts of Brabant (1921)
 Belgian Revenge (1922)
 Mimi Pinson (1924)

References

Bibliography
 Philippe Rège. Encyclopedia of French Film Directors, Volume 1. Scarecrow Press, 2009.

External links

1876 births
1934 deaths
Film directors from Paris